Double Trouble is a docu-drama directed by Lee Robinson about two Australian men intolerant of foreign migrants who find themselves transported to a foreign country.

Unlike most movies from the Australian National Film Board it used professional actors, and gave Lee Robinson invaluable experience directing them prior to his first feature, The Phantom Stockman (1953).

The film has since come to be regarded as historically significant because of its depiction of attitudes towards Australian immigration at the time.

Robinson and editor Inman Hunter later wrote a story for a drama film together which became The Siege of Pinchgut (1959).

Cast
Frank Waters
Ken McCarron
Maurice Travers
Charles Farrell

References

External links
Double Trouble at National Film and Sound Archive

1951 films
Australian black-and-white films
1950s English-language films